Iulie Margrethe Nicolaysen Aslaksen (born 1956) is a Norwegian economist and Senior Researcher at Statistics Norway. She was a member of the Petroleum Price Board from 1990 to 2000. She is an expert on energy and environmental economics, including petroleum economics, climate policy and economics and sustainable development. She is cand.oecon. from the University of Oslo in 1981 and dr.polit. from 1990. She has been a visiting researcher and Fulbright Fellow at Harvard University and the University of California, Berkeley, and Associate Professor of Economics at the University of Oslo. She was a member of the government commissions resulting in the Norwegian Official Report 1988:21 Norsk økonomi i forandring (A Changing Norwegian Economy) and the Norwegian Official Report 1999:11 Analyse av investeringsutviklingen på kontinentalsokkelen (Analysis of Investments on the Norwegian Continental Shelf).

Selected bibliography

Thesis

Chapters in books 
 
  (pdf version)

Journal articles

See also 
 Feminist economics
 List of feminist economists

References

External links 
 Profile: Iulie Aslaksen Statistics Norway

1956 births
Environmental social scientists
Environmental economists
Feminist economists
Harvard University faculty
Living people
Norwegian economists
Norwegian women economists
Norwegian environmentalists
University of Oslo alumni
Academic staff of the University of Oslo